Łokieć  (Lokot’) is a former village in the administrative district of Gmina Lutowiska, within Bieszczady County, Subcarpathian Voivodeship, in south-eastern Poland, on the border with Ukraine.

References

Villages in Bieszczady County